Calicut International Airport , also known as Kozhikode International Airport or Karipur Airport, is an international airport serving the city of Kozhikode, Kerala, India. It is located at Karipur in the Malappuram district of the South Malabar region. It serves the Malabar region, consisting of Malappuram, Wayanad and Palakkad. It serves two of the seven metropolitan areas in the state—Kozhikode metropolitan area and Malappuram metropolitan area. The airport opened on 13 April 1988. The airport serves as an operating base for Air India Express and operates Hajj Pilgrimage services to Medina and Jeddah from Kerala. It is tied with Hyderabad in terms of international traffic. It received international airport status on 2 February 2006. It is one of a few airports in the country with a tabletop runway.

History

Early years
The airport was inaugurated on 13 April 1988.

In 1977, the airport was sanctioned due to long periods of struggle under the leadership of the late freedom fighter, K. P. Kesava Menon. In the 1990s, Gulf Malayalis played an important role in the development of the airport - they collected funds for the purpose when the Union Government claimed it did not have any. This led to the inception of the Malabar International Airport Development Society, which helped raise funds for the airport's development. Consequently, major developments of facilities, such as an extension of the runway from 6,000 feet to 9,000 feet to facilitate the operation of large aircraft, were carried out with loans from the Housing and Urban Development Corporation (HUDCO).

It received the status of an international airport on 2 February 2006, which led to more development in its infrastructure, for handling the operation of international flights from its terminal. It is the 12th-busiest airport in India in terms of its passenger traffic and 11th-busiest in cargo handling.

Wide-body aircraft restrictions 
Since 1 May 2015, the Airports Authority of India (AAI) imposed restrictions on the operation of wide-body aircraft such as Boeing 777 and 747 for a period of six months for runway recarpeting, which had been long overdue at this airport. As a result, Emirates, Saudia and two Air India Boeing 747 flight operations had to move temporarily to Cochin International Airport during this time. The airport authorities had expressed doubt about getting permission to operate wide-bodied aircraft from the airport, even after the completion of the recarpeting, for the runway in the airport is not large enough for the operation of jumbo aircraft. AAI had earlier instructed that all airports using widebody aircraft must have 240 m of Runway End Safety Area (RESA) in each direction, whereas that of Calicut Airport must have 90 m. The airport director K Janardhanan said the short runway was a major hurdle in operating wide-bodied aircraft from the tabletop runway and the runway length should be extended from the current 2,850 m to 3,150 m to operate wide-bodied aircraft, he added. The state government has been finding the task difficult, for it requires relocation of 1,500 families living around the airport. As of 10 June 2016, not much action has been taken for land acquisition to help increase the runway length. The AAI decided to get a runway safety area to avoid the aircraft overrunning the end of the table-top runway. On 7 August 2020, wide-body aircraft have been banned from flying to CCJ after the crash of IX 1344, which overran the table-top runway. As of November 2020, the airport does not have the recommended Runway safety area or Engineered Materials Arresting System installed. The land acquisition procedures for runway development are progressing as of July 2022.

Reinstatement of wide-body aircraft operations 
As advocated by various Malayali associations like KMCC, MCC and MDF and others, Gulf Malayalis, political parties, Kerala State Government and MPs from Malabar region, on 9 August 2018, DGCA gave approval for resuming wide-body aircraft (Code E category) operations from Calicut International Airport. In the beginning, Saudia has been given permission to start nonstop flights to Jeddah and Riyadh using Boeing 777-200LR and Airbus A330-300. After three and a half years, the wide-body aircraft (Airbus 330-300) of Saudi Arabian Airlines from Jeddah landed at Calicut International Airport at 11:04 (IST) on 5 December 2018. It flew back to Jeddah on the same day at 13:19 (IST). Saudia has also resumed its services to Riyadh from Calicut in December 2018. On 5 July 2019, Saudi Arabian Airlines flew with the Boeing 777-300ER and Airbus A330-300 to CCJ. DGCA gave approval for wide-body aircraft operations of Air India from Calicut International Airport using Boeing 747-400, Boeing 777-200LR, Boeing 777-300ER, and Boeing 787-8 Dreamliner. Emirates also secured approval from DGCA to operate Boeing 777-200LR and 777-300ER from Calicut. Air India already resumed its service with Boeing 747-400 Jumbo aircraft and with Boeing 777-300 ER aircraft.

On 7 August 2020, Air India Express Flight 1344, a COVID-19 repatriation flight on the Dubai-Kozhikode route, overran the tabletop runway upon landing in bad weather and crashed into the runway slope, killing 21 passengers. As a result, no wide-body aircraft has permission to fly to Kozhikode Airport, and as of 7 July 2022, runway renovation is in progress. It was reported that wide-body airlines like Emirates had ceased flying to Kozhikode Airport due to the unsafety of the runway and the airport. Only low-cost airlines like SpiceJet and Air India Express are now flying to Kozhikode Airport, since they have narrow-body fleet that can land safely on the tabletop runway.

Airlines and destinations

Passenger

Cargo
The following cargo airlines fly to the airport:

 SpiceXpress

Connectivity 
 Road
Calicut International Airport is located between two National Highways. The closest one is National Highway 966 (NH-966) situated at a distance of 2.3 kilometers and the other one being National Highway 66 (NH-66) which is around 8 kilometers from the airport. NH-966 joins NH-66 at Ramanattukara, located 12 kilometers from the airport. This combined road network enables seamless connectivity to the north to Kozhikode, Kannur, and Wayanad, and towards the south to Malappuram, Palakkad, Thrissur, and Coimbatore.

Buses 
Kerala State Road Transport Corporation operates FlyBus (low-floor AC bus) services to the city of Kozhikode from the airport. This is one of the cheapest available options to travel to the city. There are only a handful of these services so travelers looking for cheap options to travel can take an Auto-rickshaw to Airport Junction (2.8 km away) where buses are available to Kozhikode, Malappuram, Palakkad etc.

Rail
The closest railway stations are Feroke railway station (around 18 kilometers from the airport), Parappanangadi railway station (around 20 kilometers from the airport), Tanur railway station (around 28 kilometers from the airport), Kozhikode railway station (around 28 kilometers from the airport), Tirur railway station (around 34 kilometers away), and Angadipuram railway station (around 37 kilometres away), which are connected to all major cities in India.

Taxis
Pre-paid taxi services are available at the airport. The airport is also serviced by Uber and Ola Cabs, online cab aggregators providing various options to Calicut city and for Outstation journeys.

Statistics

Accidents and incidents
 On 17 January 1969, a Douglas C-47A VT-DTH of Hindu Publications crashed on take-off. The aircraft was operating a cargo flight. Both crew were killed. At the time the airport had been initialized as an air strip at "Chelari", a few kilometres away from the current location.
 On 7 November 2008, Air India Flight 962, an Airbus 310 flying from Jeddah, Saudi Arabia, scraped its right wingtip on the runway on landing. Parts of the plane's wing broke, leaving a mark on the runway.
 On 9 July 2012, an Air India Express Boeing 737-800 skidded on landing, during heavy rain. The aircraft's landing gear impacted with runway beacons, breaking them. There were no casualties on board.
 On 10 June 2015 an argument between Central Industrial Security Force (CISF) and Airports Authority of India (AAI) personnel at the airport escalated into firearm discharging, leading to one person's death and serious injuries to two others late on Wednesday night.
 On 25 April 2017, Air India Flight 937, an Air India A321-200 suffered an engine failure during takeoff, the aircraft temporarily lost directional control due to asymmetric thrust resulting in a left tyre burst when it impacted the runway edge lighting. The takeoff was aborted and the flight cancelled.
 On 4 August 2017, a SpiceJet Bombardier Dash 8 skidded on landing and damaged the ILS beacons.
 On 7 August 2020, Air India Express Flight 1344 crashed upon landing at Calicut from Dubai during poor weather. After landing, the aircraft, a Boeing 737-800, overran the tabletop runway, skidding off the end of the runway and crashing into a gorge. A total of 21 people, including both pilots, were killed in the crash. 15 people aboard were in critical condition and survived later. The aircraft had been carrying out a repatriation flight under the Vande Bharat Mission.

See also
 Kannur International Airport
 Cochin International Airport
 Trivandrum International Airport
 Aranmula International Airport
 Sabarimala International Airport
 List of Airports in Kerala
 List of airports in India
 List of the busiest airports in India

References

External links

 Calicut International Airport at Airports Authority of India

Airports in Kerala
International airports in India
Buildings and structures in Malappuram district
Transport in Kozhikode
Airports established in 1988
1988 establishments in Kerala
20th-century architecture in India